The Palana is a west-flowing river on the west side of the upper Kamchatka Peninsula, Russia. It flows into the Sea of Okhotsk. The town of Palana lies on its right bank, near its mouth.

Jurassic radiolarians have been found near the mouth of the river.

References

Rivers of Kamchatka Krai
Drainage basins of the Sea of Okhotsk